Doreen Jacobi (born 28 February 1974) is a German actress and former model.

Education 
Between 1992 and 1993, Jacobi studied English, American Studies and Theater Studies.

From 1994, she took private drama lessons in London and New York City. In 1995 she completed various dance classes at the Actor's Center in Sydney.

From 2008 to 2011, she studied Information Technology at the University of Potsdam and graduated with a MBA degree.

Acting
Jacobi became known in the early 1990s through the German ZDF television series Our Teacher, Doctor Specht. She was part of the main cast and, in parallel with her preparatory school studies, made 13 episodes between 1990 and 1992.

In 1997 she achieved a major audience with a leading role in the Sat.1 action series HeliCops – Einsatz über Berlin. Other engagements, mostly in television films and series, followed.

Modelling 
In 1993 she was discovered by a model scout of the agency Berlin Models. and took second place in Europe's largest model competition.

Software 
In 1999, Jacobi co-founded an enterprise software company, for which she works as a manager.

Filmography (selection)
 1993-1995: Unser Lehrer Doktor Specht (TV series)
 1997: Lexx - The Dark Zone (TV series, episode 3: Eating Pattern)
 1997: HeliCops – Einsatz über Berlin (Television series)
 1998: Angel Express
 1998, 2009: Alarm für Cobra 11 – Die Autobahnpolizei (TV series, 2 episodes)
 1999: 
 2000: Anna H. - Beloved, Wife and Whore (TV)
 2000: The Runner (TV movie)
 2002: The Best Piece (TV)
 2003: Motown
 2003: The most beautiful from Bitterfeld (TV)
 2004: The Very Best Piece (TV)
 2004: Problemzone Schwiegereltern (TV movie)
 2005: Macho in the spin-up (TV movie)
 2006:  (TV movie)
 2007: Tatort: The Lawyer (Television series)
 2008: U-900
 2009: 12 Winter (TV series)
 2014: Between Times

References

External links
 
 Dorreen Jacobi at filmportal.de
 Official Website 
 Jacobi at her agency Web site

1974 births
Living people
University of Potsdam alumni